Walter Kaiser (2 November 1907 – 25 February 1982) was a German professional footballer who played as a striker. Kaiser played in France for Rennes between 1930 and 1938, and was the Division 1 topscorer in the 1932–33 season, alongside Robert Mercier, scoring 15 goals.

References
 Claude Loire, Le Stade rennais, volume II, Rennes, Apogée, 1997, p. 72
 Marc Barreaud, Dictionnaire des footballeurs étrangers du championnat professionnel français (1932-1997), l'Harmattan, 1997.

1907 births
1982 deaths
People from Neuwied
People from the Rhine Province
Sportspeople from Ille-et-Vilaine
Association football forwards
German footballers
German expatriate footballers
Expatriate footballers in France
German expatriate sportspeople in France
Ligue 1 players
Stade Rennais F.C. players
University of Rennes alumni
Footballers from Rhineland-Palatinate